Martha Kathleen Henry  (née Buhs; February 17, 1938October 21, 2021) was an American-born Canadian stage, film, and television actress.  She was noted for her work at the Stratford Festival in Stratford, Ontario.

Early life and training
Martha Kathleen Buhs was born in Detroit, Michigan, on February 17, 1938. Her parents, Kathleen (née Hatch) and Lloyd Howard Buhs, divorced when she was around five years old.  She grew up in the northern Detroit suburb of Bloomfield Hills, Michigan, attended the Kingswood School (today Cranbrook Kingswood School), and graduated from the drama department at Carnegie Institute of Technology before moving to Canada in 1959. She later adopted the stage surname Henry, the legal surname of her first husband Donnelly Rhodes, whom she married in 1962.

Henry performed at Toronto's Crest Theatre upon her arrival in Canada, and was soon after accepted into the first class at the National Theatre School in Montreal. In 1961, the Theatre School took its students to Stratford to perform scene selections for the Festival company. Henry caught the attention of Artistic Director Michael Langham, who offered her a spot in the 1962 company based entirely on her performance that day. Accepting the offer would have required Henry to leave the Theatre School part way through the three-year program, however NTS Director Powys Thomas advised her to take the offer, saying she would learn more with the Stratford company than at the Theatre School. She took the offer and was awarded a diploma ahead of the inaugural class, making her the Theatre School's first graduate.

Leading actress at Stratford
During Henry's first season at the Stratford Festival in 1962, she played Miranda to William Hutt's first Prospero in The Tempest, and Lady Macduff in Macbeth.  Between the 1962 and 1980 seasons, she played leading roles in 40 productions, and made her directing debut in 1980. Some of her roles during this time included Cordelia in King Lear (1964), Viola in Twelfth Night (1966), Titania in A Midsummer Night's Dream (1968), Desdemona in Othello (1973), Isabella in Measure for Measure (1975-1976), Olga in Three Sisters (1976), Lady Anne in Richard III (1977), and Paulina in The Winter's Tale (1978). During brief periods away from Stratford, Henry performed elsewhere in Canada and abroad, including Manitoba Theatre Centre, Shaw Festival, Broadway, New York's Lincoln Centre, and London's West End.

Henry and three other directors (Urjo Kareda, Peter Moss and Pam Brighton) were appointed to lead Stratford's 1981 season after the resignation of Artistic Director Robin Phillips, but the group was dismissed a few months later when the Board of Directors had lined up English stage director John Dexter to replace them. A major uproar ensued across the Canadian arts community, and Immigration Minister Lloyd Axworthy denied Dexter a work permit. A month later, Canadian director John Hirsch was appointed artistic director for the 1981 season. The "Gang of Four" fallout caused Henry and other Stratford veterans to work away from the Festival for many years, but the enduring result was noted by actor R.H. Thomson as "Stratford turning (a corner) and becoming a deeply Canadian enterprise".

Directing and later stage career
After 1980, Henry performed and directed at major arts venues across North America, including Tarragon Theatre, Canadian Stage, Globe Theatre, the National Arts Centre, Roy Thompson Hall, Citadel Theatre, Theatre Calgary, Manitoba Theatre Centre, Shaw Festival, Neptune Theatre, and Carnegie Mellon University.

Henry was artistic director of the Grand Theatre in London, Ontario, from 1988 to 1995, during which time she programmed a wide variety of contemporary works, including newer plays such as Oleanna by David Mamet, The Rez Sisters by Tomson Highway, and The Stillborn Lover by Timothy Findley.

Henry's return to the Stratford stage in 1994 as Mary Tyrone in Long Day's Journey Into Night was widely acclaimed, and the production was remounted for the 1995 season. A filmed version of the production earned her a 1996 Genie Award. The return also marked the start of a second lengthy run for Henry at Stratford, with her performing in leading and supporting roles, directing, and instructing. In 2007, she was appointed director of Stratford's Birmingham Conservatory for Classical Theatre Training, a program that has trained many promising new Canadian actors. Her production of All My Sons by Arthur Miller was included in multiple theatre reviewers' lists of top theatre productions in 2016. In 2017, she took over leadership of Stratford's Michael Langham Workshop for Classical Direction.

In 2018, in her 44th season of performing, at age 80, Henry played Prospero in The Tempest, directed by Antoni Cimolino. Chris Jones, theater critic for the Chicago Tribune, wrote "in all my years watching shows at this theater, a miragelike fountain of excellence ... I have never seen anything quite like the experience of watching Henry".

During the COVID-19 pandemic in 2021, Henry played the role of "A" in Three Tall Women by Edward Albee at Stratford's Studio Theatre. In his review of the production, J. Kelly Nestruck of the Globe and Mail said "Henry’s performance is a reminder of how much more daringly theatrical her generation of stage actors – she’s now in her 80s – can be".. A stage to screen adaptation of Henry's final performance in Three Tall Women was captured by director Barry Avrich months before Henry passed away; following its television broadcast in 2022, it received several Canadian Screen Award nominations at the 11th Canadian Screen Awards in 2023, including a posthumous nod for Henry in the category Best Performance in a Television Film or Miniseries.

Personal life
Henry's marriages to Rhodes, Douglas Rain, and Rod Beattie all ended in divorce.  She had one child (Emma) with Rain.

Henry died of cancer shortly after midnight on October 21, 2021, at her home in Stratford, Ontario, twelve days after her final stage appearance in Three Tall Women.

Honours
Henry was made an officer of the Order of Canada in 1981, and promoted to companion in 1990. She was made a member of the Order of Ontario in 1994. Henry received a Governor General's Performing Arts Award for her lifetime contribution to Canadian theatre in 1996.

Television roles
Notable television roles include Catherine in Empire, Inc., the prime minister's mother in H2O, and the owner of the Chateau Rousseau in Ken Finkleman's At the Hotel.  In 1994, she starred in the TV film And Then There Was One.

References

Further reading

External links
 
 
An Interview with Martha Henry by TheatreMuseumCanada
 Entry at thecanadianencyclopedia.ca

1938 births
2021 deaths
Canadian stage actresses
Canadian film actresses
Canadian television actresses
Companions of the Order of Canada
Best Actress Genie and Canadian Screen Award winners
Best Supporting Actress Genie and Canadian Screen Award winners
Members of the Order of Ontario
National Theatre School of Canada alumni
American emigrants to Canada
Actresses from Detroit
Governor General's Performing Arts Award winners
Canadian Shakespearean actresses
Deaths from cancer in Ontario